Sereno (Serene) is the 14th studio album by Latin Grammy-winning Spanish musician and actor Miguel Bosé. It was released by WEA Latina on January 29, 2002.

Track listing
 "Puede Que"
 "Gulliver"
 "Mirarte"
 "El Hijo del Capitán Trueno"
 "Te Digo Amor"
 "Tic Tac"
 "Mientras Respire"
 "Morena Mía"
 "La Noche Me Gusta"
 "A Millones de km. de Aquí"
 "Sereno"

Sales and certifications

References

2002 albums
Miguel Bosé albums
Latin Grammy Award for Best Male Pop Vocal Album
Warner Music Latina albums